Peter Kudelka (born February 12, 1988) is a Slovak former professional ice hockey player who played with HC Slovan Bratislava in the Slovak Extraliga.

References

1988 births
Living people
HC Slovan Bratislava players
Slovak ice hockey defencemen
Slovak expatriate ice hockey people
Slovak expatriate sportspeople in Finland
Slovak ice hockey coaches
Ice hockey people from Bratislava